Contentnea Creek is a major tributary of the Neuse River in North Carolina, USA. It is part of the Neuse River Basin, and flows for 91 miles between the Buckhorn Reservoir (confluence of Moccasin and Turkey Creeks), where it begins, and Grifton, North Carolina, where it flows into the Neuse River.

Contentnea Creek begins as the outflow of Buckhorn Reservoir 12 miles west of Wilson, North Carolina. from there it flows through the Wiggins Mill Reservoir on the southwest side of Wilson, past the towns of Stantonsburg and Snow Hill, and finally emptying into the Neuse River 3 miles southeast of Grifton.

References

Rivers of North Carolina